Glochidion grantii, also known by the synonym Phyllanthus grantii, is a species of tree or shrub in the family Phyllanthaceae. It is endemic to the islands of Tahaa and Raiatea in the Society Islands of French Polynesia, where it is restricted to montane plateaus and ridge forests at elevations of 435–730 meters.

References

Flora of French Polynesia
grantii
Vulnerable plants
Taxonomy articles created by Polbot